La Voix du Nord may refer to:

La Voix du Nord (daily), a French regional daily in Lille, France
La Voix du Nord (album), an album by Swedish singer Malena Ernman